
Year 317 BC was a year of the pre-Julian Roman calendar. At the time, it was known as the Year of the Consulship of Brutus and Barbula (or, less frequently, year 437 Ab urbe condita). The denomination 317 BC for this year has been used since the early medieval period, when the Anno Domini calendar era became the prevalent method in Europe for naming years.

Events 
 By place 

 Macedonian Empire 
 Seleucus joins Antigonus against Eumenes and recaptures Babylon.
 Battle of Paraitacene: The first battle of Western armies each with an elephant corps who fight for control over Alexander's empire. The armies of Antigonus and Eumenes fight each other near today's Isfahan in Persia with no clear victor.
 Armenia's Persian satrap, Ardvates, frees his country from Macedonian control.
 After capturing Athens from Macedonia's regent Polyperchon, Cassander entrusts the government of Athens to the Athenian orator, statesman, and philosopher, Demetrius Phalereus.
 Polyperchon flees to Epirus, where he joins Alexander the Great's mother Olympias, Alexander's widow Roxana, and Alexander's infant son Alexander IV. He forms an alliance with Olympias, who is acting as regent for Alexander IV, and King Aeacides of Epirus.
 While Cassander is occupied in the Peloponnesus, Olympias leads an army into Macedonia. She is initially successful, defeating the army of King Philip III Arrhidaeus and capturing King Philip and his wife, Eurydice, as well as Cassander's brother, Nicanor. She then has them murdered.
 Ptolemy marries Berenice, lady-in-waiting to Eurydice, wife of Ptolemy.

 Sicily 
 Acestorides, a native of Corinth, is made supreme commander by the citizens of Syracuse.
 After twice being banished for attempting to overthrow the oligarchical party, Agathocles returns with an army and banishes or murders about 10,000 citizens (including the oligarchs), and sets himself up as tyrant of Syracuse. Acestorides is banished from the city.

 By topic 

 Art 
 Private funeral monuments are banned in Athenian cemeteries.

 Literature 
 Menander wins the first prize at the Lenaian festival with his play Dyskolos (The Grouch).

Births

Deaths 
 King Philip III of Macedon (b. c. 359 BC)
 Queen Eurydice III of Macedon
 Nicanor Macedonian officer of Cassander and the son in law of Aristotle.

References